Carabus coriaceus is a species of beetle widespread in Europe, where it is primarily found in deciduous forests and mixed forests.

References
Carabus (Procrustes) coriaceus coriaceus L., 1758 (Carabidae) - atlas of beetles of Russia

coriaceus
Beetles of Europe
Beetles described in 1758
Taxa named by Carl Linnaeus